The 1920 Harvard Crimson football team was an American football team that represented Harvard University as an independent during the 1920 college football season. In its second year under head coach Bob Fisher, the Crimson compiled an 8–0–1 record, shut out seven of nine opponents, and outscored all opponents by a total of 208 to 28.

There was no contemporaneous system in 1920 for determining a national champion. However, Harvard was retroactively named as the co-national champion by the Boand System. The majority of selectors have chosen California (9–0 record) as the national champion for 1920.

Harvard guard Tom Woods was selected as consensus first-team player on the 1920 All-America team. Other notable players on the 1920 Harvard team included halfback George Owen, fullback Arnold Horween, back Frederic Cameron Church Jr., center Charles Frederick Havemeyer, guard James Randolph Tolbert, and tackle Robert Minturn Sedgwick.

Schedule

References

Harvard
Harvard Crimson football seasons
College football national champions
College football undefeated seasons
Harvard Crimson football
1920s in Boston